Santana André Pitra was the Angolan minister for the interior in the 1994 government of Jose Eduardo dos Santos.

In 1976 he founded the football club G.D. Interclube.

References 

Living people
Year of birth missing (living people)
Angolan politicians
Governors of Huambo
Interior ministers of Angola